Aratinga is a genus of South American conures. Most are predominantly green, although a few are predominantly yellow or orange. They are social and commonly seen in groups in the wild. In Brazil, the popular name of several species usually is jandaia, sometimes written as jandaya in the scientific form.

Many species from this genus are popular pets, although being larger than the members of the genus Pyrrhura, they need a sizable aviary to thrive.

Taxonomy
The genus Aratinga was introduced in 1824 by the German naturalist Johann Baptist von Spix. The type species was subsequently designated as the sun parakeet. The genus name is from the extinct Tupi language of Brasil. Ará tinga means "bright bird" or "bright parrot".

The taxonomy of this genus has recently been resolved by splitting it in four genera, as the genus as previously defined was paraphyletic. The species of the Aratinga solstitialis complex, were retained in this genus, while other former Aratinga species were moved to Eupsittula (brownish-throated species), Psittacara (pale-beaked species) and Thectocercus (blue-crowned parakeet). Furthermore, the closely related nanday parakeet (A. nenday) and the dusky-headed parakeet (A. weddellii) are placed in this genus. The nanday parakeet was previously placed in its own genus based on the differences in coloration and elongated upper mandible, but this was not supported by phylogenetic studies that showed a close relationship with the A. solstitialis species complex.

Species

Hypothetical extinct species

Jean-Baptiste Labat described a population of small parrots living on Guadeloupe, which has been postulated to be a separate species based on little evidence. They were called Conurus labati, and are now referred to as the Guadeloupe parakeet (Aratinga labati). No specimens or remains of the extinct parrots are known. Their taxonomy may never be fully elucidated,  so their postulated status as a separate species is hypothetical, and it is regarded as a hypothetical extinct species.

References

 
Arini (tribe)
Bird genera
Taxa named by Johann Baptist von Spix